"Rescue" is the tenth single by Japanese boy band, KAT-TUN, and their fourth single from their fourth studio album, Break the Records: By You & For You. It was released on March 11, 2009 and became the group's tenth consecutive number one single on the Oricon daily and weekly charts tying them with NEWS for the second longest streak of number one singles since their debut in Japanese music history.

Single information
The single was released in three pressings - a first press limited edition which included a DVD featuring the single's music video and a featurette of the making of the former, a first press normal edition which included a bonus track, and a regular edition with the instrumental versions of the single and its B-side track, "7 Days Battle".

Chart performance
In its first week of its release, the single topped the Oricon singles chart, reportedly selling 322,597 copies. KAT-TUN gained their  tenth consecutive number one single on the Oricon Weekly Singles Chart since their debut with all their singles sold more than 200,000 copies and continued to hold the second most consecutive number one singles since debut with fellow Johnny's group, NEWS. By the end of the year, "Rescue" was reported by Oricon to sell 377,097 copies and was later certified Platinum by RIAJ denoting over 250,000 shipments.

The song was honored at the 24th Japan Gold Disc Awards when it placed on the "Best 10 Music Singles (Domestic)".

Track listings
 Normal Edition

 First Press Limited Edition

 First Press Normal Edition

Sales and certifications

References

KAT-TUN songs
2009 singles
Oricon Weekly number-one singles
Billboard Japan Hot 100 number-one singles
Japanese television drama theme songs
2009 songs